is a Japanese volleyball player. She plays for the Japan women's national volleyball team. She competed at the 2020 Summer Olympics, in Women's volleyball.

Career 
She participated in the 2017 FIVB Volleyball Girls' U18 World Championship , 2018 Asian Women's Club Volleyball Championship, 2019 FIVB Volleyball Women's U20 World Championship, 2019 Asian Women's Volleyball Championship, and 2021 FIVB Volleyball Women's Nations League.

She plays for NEC Red Rockets.

References 

2000 births
Living people
People from Aichi Prefecture
Sportspeople from Aichi Prefecture
Japanese women's volleyball players
Volleyball players at the 2020 Summer Olympics
Olympic volleyball players of Japan